Elections to the Liverpool School Board were held on Saturday 17 November 1894.

There were twenty-two candidates for the fifteen Board member positions.

Each voter had fifteen votes to cast.

After the election, the composition of the School Board was:

* - Retiring board member seeking re-election

Elected

Not Elected

References

1894
1894 English local elections
1890s in Liverpool
November 1894 events